The Unveiling Hand is a lost 1919 silent film drama directed by Frank Hall Crane and starring Kitty Gordon. It was produced and distributed by World Film Company.

Cast
Kitty Gordon - Margaret Ellis
Frederick Warde - Judge Ellis
Irving Cummings - Philip Bellamy
George MacQuarrie - Bob Harding
Reginald Carrington - Col. Harding
Margaret Seddon - Mrs. Bellamy
Warren Cook - Dr. Wallace
Tony Merlo - Hassan (*as Anthony Merlo)

References

External links
 The Unveiling Hand at IMDb.com

1919 films
American silent feature films
Lost American films
World Film Company films
Silent American drama films
1919 drama films
1919 lost films
1910s American films